King's Highway 72, commonly referred to as Highway 72, is a provincially maintained highway in the northern half of the Canadian province of Ontario. The highway connects Highway 17 in Dinorwic with the town of Sioux Lookout, where there are connections with Highway 516 towards Savant Lake and Highway 642 towards Silver Dollar.

Highway 72 was built as a trunk route by 1920, and became a provincial highway in 1937. It has remained largely unchanged since then, aside from the reconstruction and realignment of the Frog Rapids bridge, and the renumbering of the fork towards Hudson as Highway 664. There are no significant settlements between its endpoints.

Route description 
Highway 72 is a  route which serves to connect Sioux Lookout with the Trans-Canada Highway. The route begins at Highway 17, on the western edge of Dinorwic. From there it follows an old routing of Highway 17 along the northern edge of the village, but eventually turns to the north into the wilderness. Between this point and south of the Frog Rapids Narrows, where Highway 664 intersects the route, the highways passes through a remote forested region dotted with lakes and muskeg; there is almost no human habitation.
After crossing the Frog Rapids Narrows, the highway enters Sioux Lookout. It zig-zags through the town, crossing the old Grand Trunk Railroad, now a Canadian National Railway line, next to a large rail depot. It exits Sioux Lookout, ending at an intersection with the Ed Ariano Bypass, Highway 516 and Highway 642 just east of the town.

History 

Sioux Lookout and Hudson were both originally accessible only by rail and water when they were established as stops on the Grand Trunk Railway shortly after 1900; roads would not reach the remote area until 1920.
The road connecting Sioux Lookout and Hudson with the Ignace–Dryden Road was initially under the upkeep of the Department of Northern Development. On April 1, 1937, that department was merged into the Department of Highways (DHO), after which the provincial highway network was expanded into northern Ontario.

Shortly after the merger, the DHO began to assume highways throughout northern Ontario. On October 6, 1937, Highway 72 was established,
connecting Highway 17 with both Sioux Lookout and Hudson.
This routing remained in place until at least 1953.
By 1954, however, the branch leading to Hudson was renumbered as Highway 116.
Highway 72 has, aside from minor realignments, remained unchanged since then.

Major intersections

References 

072